Railroad Wash may mean:

 Railroad Wash (Gila River tributary), in Greenlee County, Arizona and Hidalgo County, New Mexico
 Railroad Wash (Gold Gulch tributary), in Cochise County, Arizona